Batom Reachea III (born Ang Nan; 1654–1691) was a Cambodian vice king (uparaja) from 1682 to 1689.

Ang Nan was the grandson of vice king Outey. In 1674, with the help of the Ayutthaya Kingdom, Preah Keo II drove him out. Ang Nan fled to Thái Khang (present day Khánh Hòa Province of Vietnam), and sought help from Vietnamese Nguyễn lord. The Vietnamese army under Nguyễn Dương Lâm (阮楊林) and Nguyễn Đình Phái (阮廷派) invaded Cambodia, captured Prey Nokor (Saigon), then attacked Phnom Penh. Preah Keo II retreated into the forest and Ang Nan was crowned the vice king (uparaja) by the Vietnamese. Ang Nan occupied Prey Nokor, while king Chey Chettha IV occupied Longvek. Both of them paid tribute to Nguyễn lord every year.

However, Ang Nan wanted to overthrow Chey Chettha IV. In 1682, he recruited refugees from Ming China who had settled in Cambodia with Vietnamese immigrants, resumed fighting against Chey Chettha IV. In response, Kau Kan (Bassac, present day Sóc Trăng) and Preah Trapeang (Trà Vinh) were ceded to these Chinese adventures. In 1689, with the help of the Nguyễn lord, he made his last attempt to overthrow Chey Chettha IV. He died in Srey Santhor.

References

 Phoeun Mak, Dharma Po. « La deuxième intervention militaire vietnamienne au Cambodge (1673-1679) » dans: Bulletin de l'École française d'Extrême-Orient. Tome 77, 1988. p. 229-262.
 Phoen Mak, Dharma Po. « La troisième intervention vietnamienne au Cambodge (1679-1688) » Dans: Bulletin de l'École française d'Extrême-Orient. Tome 92, 2005. p. 339-381.
 A. Dauphin-Meunier Histoire du Cambodge P.U.F Paris 1968.

1654 births
1691 deaths
17th-century Cambodian monarchs
Monarchs who abdicated